is a Japanese football player. He plays for Montedio Yamagata.

Career
Masaaki Goto joined J2 League club Shonan Bellmare in 2017. On July 12, he debuted in Emperor's Cup (v Júbilo Iwata).

Club statistics
Updated 26 July 2022.

References

External links
Profile at Shonan Bellmare

1994 births
Living people
Waseda University alumni
Association football people from Saitama Prefecture
Japanese footballers
J1 League players
J2 League players
Shonan Bellmare players
Zweigen Kanazawa players
Association football goalkeepers
People from Tokorozawa, Saitama